The 2020 North Carolina Democratic presidential primary took place on March 3, 2020, as one of 15 contests scheduled on Super Tuesday in the Democratic Party primaries for the 2020 presidential election, following the South Carolina primary the weekend before. The North Carolina primary was a semi-closed primary, with the state awarding 122 delegates towards the 2020 Democratic National Convention, of which 110 were pledged delegates allocated on the basis of the results of the primary.

Former vice president Joe Biden won the state with 43% of the vote, gaining 68 delegates, far ahead of senator Bernie Sanders, who attained around 24% and 37 delegates. Biden won southern white voters and Latino voters and also scored overwhelming support from the African American community in the South. Former mayor Michael Bloomberg and senator Elizabeth Warren were below 15% and only won a few district delegates each.

Procedure
North Carolina was one of 14 states and one territory holding primaries on March 3, 2020, also known as "Super Tuesday", with governor Roy Cooper having signed a bill on June 22, 2018, which pushed the date of the primary a few weeks back to the first Tuesday in March and ordered simultaneous state, local, and presidential primaries.

Voting took place throughout the state from 6:30 a.m. until 7:30 p.m. In the semi-closed primary, candidates had to meet a threshold of 15 percent at the congressional district or statewide level in order to be considered viable. The 110 pledged delegates to the 2020 Democratic National Convention were to be allocated proportionally on the basis of the results of the primary. Of these, between 3 and 9 were allocated to each of the state's 13 congressional districts and another 14 were allocated to party leaders and elected officials (PLEO delegates), in addition to 24 at-large delegates. The Super Tuesday primary as part of Stage I on the primary timetable received no bonus delegates, in order to disperse the primaries between more different date clusters and keep too many states from hoarding on the first shared date or on a March date in general.

After county conventions on March 28, 2020 which selected delegates to the congressional district and state conventions, the congressional district conventions were held on May 16, 2020 (postponed from the original date of April 25 due to the COVID-19 pandemic) and selected national convention delegates. The state convention was subsequently held on June 6, 2020 in Raleigh to vote on the 24 at-large and 14 pledged PLEO delegates for the Democratic National Convention. The delegation also included 12 unpledged PLEO delegates: 8 members of the Democratic National Committee, 3 representatives from Congress, and the governor Roy Cooper.

Candidates
The following candidates filed and were on the ballot in North Carolina:

Running

Joe Biden
Michael Bloomberg
Tulsi Gabbard
Bernie Sanders
Elizabeth Warren

Withdrawn

Michael Bennet
Cory Booker
Pete Buttigieg
Julian Castro
John Delaney
Amy Klobuchar
Deval Patrick
Tom Steyer
Marianne Williamson
Andrew Yang

There was also a "no preference" option on the ballot.

Polling

Results

Results by county

Notes
Additional candidates

See also
 2020 North Carolina Republican presidential primary

References

External links
The Green Papers delegate allocation summary
North Carolina Democratic Party delegate selection plan 
FiveThirtyEight North Carolina primary poll tracker

North Carolina Democratic
Democratic primary
2020